Poly(rC)-binding protein 2 is a protein that in humans is encoded by the PCBP2 gene.

Function 

The protein encoded by this gene appears to be multifunctional. It along with PCBP-1 and hnRNPK corresponds to the major cellular poly(rC)-binding proteins. It contains three K-homologous (KH) domains which may be involved in RNA binding. This encoded protein together with PCBP-1 also functions as translational coactivators of poliovirus RNA via a sequence-specific interaction with stem-loop IV of the IRES and promote poliovirus RNA replication by binding to its 5'-terminal cloverleaf structure. 

It has also been implicated in translational control of the 15-lipoxygenase mRNA, human Papillomavirus type 16 L2 mRNA, and hepatitis A virus RNA. The encoded protein is also suggested to play a part in formation of a sequence-specific alpha-globin mRNP complex which is associated with alpha-globin mRNA stability.

This multiexon structural mRNA is thought to be retrotransposed to generate PCBP-1 intronless gene which has similar functions. This gene and PCBP-1 has paralogues PCBP3 and PCBP4 which is thought to arose as a result of duplication events of entire genes. It also has two processed pseudogenes PCBP2P1 and PCBP2P2. There are presently two alternatively spliced transcript variants described for this gene.

In humans, the PCBP2 gene overlaps with TUC338, a transcribed ultra-conserved element implicated in Hepatocellular carcinoma.

Interactions 
PCBP2 has been shown to interact with HNRPK, PTBP1, and HNRNPL.

References

Further reading